South Hills High School is a 9-12 public high school in Fort Worth, Texas, United States. It is one of 14 zoned high schools in the Fort Worth Independent School District.

History
South Hills opened in August 1998 with only a freshman class. The first graduating class, and the first year of 9-12 was 2002.  The original school consisted of buildings and property purchased from a private school,  Trinity Valley School.  Roughly 50 portable classrooms and the original Trinity Valley structures were used until a bond issue in 2000 allowed the school as it is now to be constructed.

In 2019 FWISD proposed rezoning all of Rosemont to South Hills.

Attendance zone

In 2019 a portion of Rosemont was zoned to South Hills.

Demographics
The demographic breakdown of the 1,537 students enrolled for the 2012-2013 school year was:
Male - 51.0%
Female - 49.0%
Native American/Alaskan - 0.7%
Asian/Pacific islanders - 3.8%
Black - 9.2%
Hispanic - 80.5%
White - 5.5%
Multiracial - 0.3%

Additionally, 75.5% of the students were eligible for free or reduced price lunch.
NCES

Athletics
The South Hills Scorpions offer the following sports:

Baseball (boys)
Basketball (boys & girls)
Cross country (boys & girls)
Football (boys)
Powerlifting
Soccer (boys & girls)
Softball (girls)
Track (boys & girls)
Volleyball (girls)
Tennis (boys & girls)
Flag Football (girls)

Notable alumni
 Brandon Edwards, current professional basketball player
 Brandon Williams, former NFL player
 Tylan Wallace, former Oklahoma State University wide receiver, 2018 All-American, 2018 Biletnikoff Award finalist.*Fourth round draft pick of the 2021 NFL draft; #131 overall to Baltimore Ravens.

References

External links

Fort Worth Independent School District

Public high schools in Fort Worth, Texas
Public high schools in Texas